Hux Records is a British record label based in England, which was launched in 1998.  They specialise in releasing old material, especially in unreleased BBC recordings such as John Peel Sessions and BBC Radio 1 concerts. Hux has gained a reputation as an excellent independent record label, offering an eclectic selection of classic archive recordings. Hux has also re-released recordings by such artists as Malcolm Morley's Sam Apple Pie and Help Yourself; and Man's debut album, which was recorded in 1976 but not released latterly (the master tapes were lost and only discovered recently).

Artists

References

External links
 Official site
 Soft Machine rerelease (BBC)
 Brinsley Schwarz rerelease (BBC)
 Incredible String Band rerelease
 Ian Gomm rerelease

British record labels
Record labels established in 1998
Reissue record labels
IFPI members